In the context of transit in New York state, the Silver Line may refer to:

 Services using the BMT Canarsie Line of the New York City Subway
 The L train, which operates along the entire length of the Canarsie Line
 Shuttles with silver emblems:
 Franklin Avenue Shuttle 
 42nd Street Shuttle 
 Rockaway Park Shuttle
 The City Terminal Zone of the Long Island Rail Road